The Auckland Infantry Regiment was a military unit of the New Zealand Expeditionary Force (NZEF) raised for service in the First World War. It saw service in the Gallipoli Campaign (1915) and on the Western Front (1916–1919). The regiment was formed by grouping together companies from four different territorial regiments based in the Auckland Military district.

History
The regiment was formed in 1914 as the Auckland Battalion. The battalion consisted of four rifle companies, with each company raised from one of the territorial regiments of the Auckland military district, namely the:
3rd (Auckland) Regiment (Countess of Ranfurly's Own)
6th (Hauraki) Regiment
15th (North Auckland) Regiment
16th (Waikato)  Regiment
Each company retained the name and cap badge of its parent territorial regiment.

Notes

References

Infantry regiments of New Zealand
Military units and formations established in 1914
Military units and formations disestablished in 1919